Claudio Panatta (born 2 February 1960) is an Italian former tennis player and younger brother of 1976 French Open champion Adriano Panatta.

Panatta won 6 doubles titles and 1 singles title during his professional career. The right-hander reached his highest singles ATP ranking on 18 June 1984, when he became the number 46 in the world.

Panatta participated in eight Davis Cup ties for Italy from 1983–87, posting a 5-8 record in singles and a 2-4 record in doubles.

During his career he beat Jimmy Arias, José Luis Clerc, Andre Agassi, Johan Kriek, José Higueras, Kim Warwick, Victor Pecci, Guillermo Pérez Roldán, Emilio Sánchez, Adriano Panatta, Corrado Barazzutti, Antonio Zugarelli, Francesco Cancellotti, and Paolo Canè.

Career ATP finals

Singles (1 titles, 3 runner-ups)

Doubles (6 titles, 6 runner-ups)

External links
 
 
 

Living people
1960 births
Italian male tennis players
Tennis players from Rome